A four-part referendum was held in Russia on 25 April 1993. Voters were asked questions on confidence in President Boris Yeltsin, support for the government's socio-economic policies and early elections for both the presidency and parliament. The referendum was initiated by the Congress of People's Deputies, which stipulated that Yeltsin would need to obtain 50% of the electorate, rather than 50% of valid votes. However, the Constitutional Court ruled that the president required only a simple majority on two issues: confidence in him, and economic and social policy; though he would still need the support of more than half the electorate in order to call new parliamentary and presidential elections.

Three of the four questions were approved by a majority of voters.

Questions
The four questions were:
Do you have confidence in the President of the Russian Federation, Boris N. Yeltsin?
Do you support the economic and social policy that has been conducted since 1992 by the President and Government of the Russian Federation?
Should there be early elections for the President of the Russian Federation?
Should there be early elections for the People's Deputies of the Russian Federation?

Results

References

Government referendum
Government referendum
Russian government referendum
1993 Russian constitutional crisis
Russian government referendum
Referendums in Russia